Cat Quest is an action role-playing video game developed by Singapore based team The Gentlebros and published by PQube. The game was released in 2017 and received generally positive reviews from professional critics.

Gameplay
Cat Quest is an action role-playing video game played from a top-down perspective similar to Dragon Quest, which this game is based on. The game is set in an open world kingdom called Felingard. The player takes controls of an anthropomorphic cat who embarks on a quest to rescue his kidnapped sister. The game features real-time combat, dungeon crawling, and equipment progression.

Plot
The game starts with an opening cutscene showing the hero and his sister on a boat in the open sea. His sister is then abducted by a white cat who destroys the hero’s boat and disappears. While the hero is unconscious, it is revealed that he possesses a strange purple mark on the back of his head. Some time later, the hero washes on the shore of Felingard, an island kingdom ruled by cats. He is awoken by his guardian spirit, Spirry, who takes the hero to a mage to learn what the purple mark means. The mage reveals that the hero is a Dragonblood, one of a group of warriors who defeated Felingard's evil dragons a long time ago, but vanished mysteriously. The hero again encounters the white cat, who is revealed another Dragonblood named Drakoth. Drakoth offers to return the hero's sister if he defeats Felingard's dragons, and the hero resolves to defeat them.

It is eventually revealed that the Dragonblood were created by a long-dead race of beings called the Old Masters, with the primary creator of the Dragonblood being an Old Master named Aelius. After exploring a number of ruins throughout Felingard, the hero learns that many years ago, the Old Masters turned against Aelius and imprisoned him in a realm called the Zero Dimension. In response, Drakoth led the Dragonblood in a rebellion against the Old Masters, wiping out both races. With Spirry's help, the hero soon defeats Felingard's dragons, but unwittingly follows Drakoth into the Zero Dimension: There, Drakoth reveals that the hero has no sister, and that the opening cutscene was only a false memory created to get the hero to follow him. Spirry admits that Drakoth is actually his master, and that he has been training the hero to get stronger with the goal of luring him into the Zero Dimension. Explaining that the death of a powerful Dragonblood is needed to free Aelius, Drakoth fights the hero, but loses and is slain. The hero and Spirry make amends and flee the collapsing Zero Dimension: At the exit, the two witness Aelius leaving before them.

Development and release
Cat Quest was developed by The Gentlebros and published by PQube. Cat Quest was released for macOS and Windows on 8 August 2017, and 10 August 2017 for iOS. It was released for Android on 15 September 2017. The Nintendo Switch version was released on 10 November 2017. It was also released on the same day for PlayStation 4 in Europe, and on 14 November in North America. A physical release for the Nintendo Switch launched in September 2018 for Europe and North America. Tesla made Cat Quest available to play via their in-vehicle infotainment systems in the 2020 Holiday update (2020.48.25).

Reception

Cat Quest received "generally favorable" reviews from professional critics according to review aggregator website Metacritic.

Cat Quest was nominated and won the Excellence in Visual Art and Design in the 2nd SEA International Mobile Game Awards 2017. It was also nominated for "Mobile Game of the Year" at the 21st Annual D.I.C.E. Awards.

Sequel
In May 2018 the developers announced a sequel, then titled Cat Quest II: The Lupus Empire. It was released on 24 October 2019, for Windows (via Steam), Xbox One, PlayStation 4 and Nintendo Switch, and in Japan on 30 January 2020, simply titled Cat Quest II.

References

External links
 

2017 video games
Action role-playing video games
Android (operating system) games
IOS games
MacOS games
Multiplayer and single-player video games
Nintendo Switch games
Open-world video games
PlayStation 4 games
PlayStation Network games
PQube games
Video games about cats
Video games developed in Singapore
Windows games